The Marañón River basin, at a low point in the Andes which made it an attractive location for trade between the Inca Empire and the Amazon basin, once harbored numerous languages which have been poorly attested or not attested at all. Those of the middle reaches of the river, above the Amazon basin, were replaced in historical times by Aguaruna, a Jivaroan language from the Amazon which is still spoken there. The languages further upriver are difficult to identify, due to lack of data. The region was multilingual at the time of the Conquest, and the people largely switched to Spanish rather than to Quechua, though Quechua also expanded during Colonial times.

In Ecuador, at the province of Loja, were Palta, Malacato, Rabona, Bolona, and Xiroa. Historical sources suggest these were closely related, and there is some evidence that Palta (see) was a Jivaroan language. The name Xiroa may be a variant of Jivaro. Rabona is attested by a few words, some of which seem to be Jivaroan, but others of which appear to be Candoshí; since these are plant names, they say little about the classification of the language, and Adelaar (2004:397) leaves it unclassified. Bolona is essentially unattested.

North of the basin were Puruhá (scarcely attested), Cañar (known primarily from characteristic place names), Panzaleo (sometimes classified as Paezan), Caranqui (until the 18th century, seemingly Barbacoan), and Pasto (Barbacoan). Apart possibly from Panzaleo, these languages have elements in common, such as a final syllable -pud and onsets mwe-, pwe-, bwe-. Those suggest that they may have been related, and possibly were all Barbacoan. Adelaar (2004:397) finds this more likely than a proposal that Puruhá and Cañar were Chimuan languages (see).

In Peru, and further up in the Andes there were also numerous languages. Apart from Mochica and Cholón, the languages of northern Peru are largely unrecorded; the attested Marañón languages are Patagón (Patagón de Perico), Bagua (Patagón de Bagua), Chacha (Chachapoya), Copallén, Tabancale, Chirino, and Sácata (Chillao).

Patagón

Patagón (Patagón de Perico, not to be confused with the Chonan languages of Tierra del Fuego and Patagonia): Four words are recorded, tuná 'water', anás 'maize',  'firewood', coará 'sheep' (evidently the word for 'sloth'). These suggest that Patagón was one of the Cariban languages, and therefore, like Aguaruna, from the Amazon (Adelaar 2004:405–406).

Bagua
Bagua (Patagón de Bagua) is attested by three words, tuna 'water', lancho 'maize', nacxé 'come here'. Tuna 'water' suggests it may be a Cariban language, like Patagón de Perico, but is insufficient evidence for classification.

Chacha
Chacha is the name sometimes given to the language of the Chachapoya culture. The Chachapoya, originally from the region of Kuelap to the east of the Marañón, were conquered by the Inca shortly before the Spanish conquest, and many were deported after the Inca Civil War. They sided with the Spanish and achieved independence for a time, but were then deported again by the Spanish, where most died of introduced disease. Their language is essentially unattested apart from toponyms and several hundred family names. Family names are mostly short and have been distorted through adaptation to Quechua; the only one which can be identified is Oc or Occ , which according to oral history means 'puma' or 'bear' (Adelaar  2004:407).

This may be the Cholón word for water; the place name Salcot or Zalcot is found three times in Cajamarca, as well as being the name of a Cholón village meaning 'black water'.

Copallén
Four words are attested from Capallén (Copallín): quiet  'water', chumac 'maize', olaman 'firewood', ismare 'house'. The word for water resembles the toponymic element -cat. However, this is insufficient to identify Copallén as a Cholón language. It was spoken in villages of Llanque, Las Lomas, and Copallen, department of Cajamarca.

Tabancale

Five words are recorded: yema 'water', moa 'maize',  'firewood',   'fire', tie 'house'. These do not correspond to any known language or family, so Tabancale (Tabancal) is unclassified and potentially a language isolate. It was spoken in Aconipa, department of Cajamarca.

Chirino

The Chirino were one of the principal peoples of the area. Based on the four words which were recorded, yungo 'water', yugato 'maize', xumás 'firewood', paxquiro  'grass', their language would appear to be related to Candoshi (Torero 1993, Adelaar 2004:406).

Sácata
Three words of the language of Sácata (Zácata), apparently that of the Chillao people, are recorded: unga 'water', umague  'maize', chichache 'fire'. Connections have been suggested with Candoshí (the word for water is similar to that of Chinino) and Arawakan, but the evidence is insufficient.

Vocabulary
The following is a vocabulary table for Patagón, Bagua, Chacha, Copallén, Tabancale, Chirino, and Sácata combined from data given in the sections above:

See also
List of unclassified languages of South America
List of extinct languages of South America
List of indigenous languages of South America
Classification of indigenous languages of the Americas
Omurano language

Notes

References 
 Adelaar, Willem F. H.; & Muysken, Pieter C. (2004). The Languages of the Andes. Cambridge Language Surveys. Cambridge University Press. .
 
 Loukotka, Čestmír. (1968). Classification of South American Indian Languages, ed. Wilbert, Johannes. Los Angeles: University of California (UCLA), Latin American Center.
 Rivet, Paul. (1934). "Population de la province de Jaén. Equateur." In Congrès international des sciences anthropologiques et ethnologiques: compte-rendu de la première session, pp. 245–7. London: Royal Institute of Anthropology.
 Taylor, Anne Christine. (1999). "The Western Margins of Amazonia from the Early Sixteenth to the Early Nineteenth Century". In Salomon and Schwartz. (1999). The Cambridge History of the Native Peoples of South America, part 2, pp. 188–256.. Cambridge University Press, 
 Torero Fernández de Córdova, Alfredo A. (1993). "Lenguas del nororiente peruano: la hoya de Jaén en el siglo XVI", Revista Andina 11, 2, pp. 447–72. Cuzco: Centro Bartolomé de Las Casas.

Indigenous languages of the Andes
Languages of Peru
Languages of Ecuador
Maranon River basin
Maranon River basin
Unclassified languages of South America
Indigenous languages of South America